North Parish was created as a civil parish in Prince County, Prince Edward Island, Canada, during the 1764–1766 survey of Samuel Holland.

It contains the following townships:

 Lot 1
 Lot 2
 Lot 3

Parishes of Prince Edward Island
Geography of Prince County, Prince Edward Island